Tie Break Tens is a tennis format in which only tie-break matches are played. There are no games or sets, only tie-break matches and the winner is the first player to reach 10 points and lead by a margin of two. Most other traditional rules of tennis are the same. The winner-take-all prize money is US$250,000 for each tournament.
It is a short-format version of tennis, similar to other alternative forms of traditional sports, such as T20 Cricket and rugby sevens.

The inaugural Tie Break Tens tournament took place at the Royal Albert Hall on 5 December 2015. It was won by Kyle Edmund who beat Andy Murray in the finals.

Since then, tournaments have been played in Vienna, Madrid, Melbourne, New York, Indian Wells and Dubai with the world's current top tennis professionals competing for the grand prize.

Rules 
Tie Break Tens is played using traditional tie-break rules. Players win by reaching 10 points (provided that they have a clear margin of two points). Rock-paper-scissors determines who serves first, and from which end of the court they play. The player who wins the toss, serves first. The other player then serves twice, and with the rest of the match continues with the players alternating serves every two points. Players change ends after every six points. Players are allowed an unlimited number of line-call challenges using review technology during each match, until an incorrect challenge is made. After this, no more challenges are allowed until the next match.

Format 
A knock-out format is used, with quarterfinals, semifinals and final.

2015: London 
The inaugural Tie Break Tens tournament took place on 5 December 2015 at the Royal Albert Hall in London. A round-robin format was used, with six players divided into two groups of three. It was staged in partnership with Champions Tennis and promoted by  IMG  with a winner-take-all prize of $250,000. Andy Murray, John McEnroe, Tim Henman, David Ferrer, Kyle Edmund and Champions Tennis qualifier  Xavier Malisse  participated in the competition.
In the final, Edmund defeated Andy Murray 10-7 and took away the $250,000 prize, more than doubling his earnings for 2015.

Men's singles

Source: Tie Break Tens

2016: Vienna 
Tie Break Tens took place on 23 October 2016, the opening weekend of the Erste Bank Open 500 in Vienna. Andy Murray, Jo Wilfried Tsonga, Dominic Thiem, Tommy Haas, Goran Ivanisevic and Marcus Willis competed. It also was competed as a round-robin.  Dominic Thiem won, defeating Andy Murray 10–5 in the Final.

Men's singles

Source: Tie Break Tens

2017: Madrid 
Tie Break Tens Tens took place at the Caja Mágica in Madrid on 4 May 2017. It featured both men's and women's tournaments for the first time. Grigor Dimitrov won the men's title with Simona Halep taking the women's title.  The knock-out format debuted here and has been used ever since.

Men's singles
Stan Wawrinka, Grigor Dimitrov, Lucas Pouille, Feliciano López, Dan Evans, Tomáš Berdych, Jack Sock and Fernando Verdasco competed in the men's tournament. Dimitrov defeated Lopez in the final.

Source: Tie Break Tens

Women's singles
Maria Sharapova, Garbiñe Muguruza, Agnieszka Radwańska, Johanna Konta, Simona Halep, Madison Keys, Svetlana Kuznetsova and Monica Puig played in the women's competition with Halep defeating Kuznetsova in the final.

Source: Tie Break Tens

2018: Melbourne
The first Tie Break Tens competition of 2018 was played on 10 January at the Margaret Court Arena in Melbourne, Australia. It featured an 8-player men's singles tournament.

Men's singles
Initially, 5 of the 8 players were confirmed: Novak Djokovic, Nick Kyrgios, Rafael Nadal, Stan Wawrinka (withdrew, replaced by Milos Raonic) and former tennis player Lleyton Hewitt. Later, Dominic Thiem, Tomáš Berdych and Lucas Pouille also announced their participation, thus completing the field.
Tomáš Berdych won the $250,000 prize defeating Nadal in the final 10–5.

Source: Tie Break Tens

2018: New York
The women's only tournament was played on 5 March 2018 in New York City at Madison Square Garden. This was the first time the competition had been staged in the United States.

Women's singles
It featured an 8-player woman's singles tournament including Serena Williams, Venus Williams, CoCo Vandeweghe, Daniela Hantuchová, Elina Svitolina, Marion Bartoli, Shuai Zhang and Sorana Cîrstea.

It marked the return of Serena Williams playing her first singles competition since giving birth to her daughter.

Svitolina from Ukraine won the $250 000 winner-takes-all prize defeating Zhang in the final 10–3.

2019: Indian Wells
The men's singles tournament was played on 5 March 2019 at Indian Wells Tennis Garden. This was their first competition at Indian Wells.

Men's singles
It was an 8-player men's singles tournament including Dominic Thiem, Stan Wawrinka, Gaël Monfils, Milos Raonic, Taylor Fritz, Rafael Nadal, Marin Čilić and David Goffin. The tournament was played in Stadium 2 at the Indian Wells Tennis Garden, in front of 8,000 people.

Raonic won the $150,000 prize by defeating Wawrinka 10–6 in the final.

2021: Dubai

Men's singles

A men's singles tournament was played in Dubai on 22 October 2021 with AED 500,000 winner take all prize money at the Coca-Cola Arena. The 8 players were Gaël Monfils, Dan Evans, Taylor Fritz, Ramkumar Ramanathan, Zizou Bergs, Dustin Brown, Simon Roberts and Benjamin Hassan.

The winner of the tournament was Zizou Bergs from Belgium, who overcame Taylor Fitz after saving a championship point, 11–9.

2022: Indian Wells

Women's singles 
The 2022 tournament was organized as a women's singles event and was played on 8 March 2022 in honor of International Women's Day. The event was held at the Indian Wells Tennis Garden for the second time, ahead of the 2022 Indian Wells Masters. The eight-player field originally included Paula Badosa, Leylah Fernandez, Simona Halep, Ons Jabeur, Barbora Krejčíková, Naomi Osaka, Aryna Sabalenka, and Maria Sakkari. Amanda Anisimova later replaced Krejčíková after she withdrew following an elbow injury. Anisimova won the event and claimed  in prize money.

2023: Indian Wells 
The event was marketed as the Eisenhower Cup.

Mixed doubles 
The 2023 tournament was organized as the event's first mixed doubles tournament and was played on 7 March 2022. The event returned to the Indian Wells Tennis Garden, ahead of the 2023 Indian Wells Masters. Emma Raducanu was scheduled to play with Cameron Norrie but withdrew before the tournament. The eight-team field includes:

Media coverage 
Each Tie Break Tens tournament is broadcast live around the world. Some of the broadcast partners have included: Sky Sports, Dubai Sports, Canal+, DAZN, Facebook Live, CNN Open Court, presented by Pat Cash, SuperSport, Teledeporte TVE, BeIN Sports, Dave ESPN 2 and ESPN 3, and Tennis Channel.

Sponsors 
Past and current sponsors of the tournament include Voss Water, Betway, Tennis.com, Mutua, Rolex, Mercedes, Estrella, Wilson, TransferMate, FILA and Masimo, SlingerBag

See also 

 Ultimate Tennis Showdown
 Glossary of tennis terms

References

External links 
 Official website

Forms of tennis
Exhibition tennis tournaments
Tennis tournaments in England
Tennis tournaments in Austria
Tennis tournaments in Spain
Tennis tournaments in Australia
Sports competitions in London
Sports competitions in Vienna
Sports competitions in Madrid
Sports competitions in Melbourne
2015 tennis exhibitions
2016 tennis exhibitions
2017 tennis exhibitions
2018 tennis exhibitions
Recurring sporting events established in 2015
2015 in English tennis
2015 sports events in London